Remfry is a surname. Notable people with the surname include:

Charlotte Remfry (1869–1957), Spanish writer
David Remfry (born 1942), British painter and curator
Keith Remfry (1947–2015), British judoka